Kisaburō, Kisaburo or Kisaburou (written: 喜三郎 or 紀三朗) is a masculine Japanese given name. Notable people with the name include:

 (1758–1806), Japanese sumo wrestler
 (1910–1991), Japanese aikidoka
 (1867–1940), Japanese politician
 (born 1948), Japanese politician

Japanese masculine given names